Viktor Hey (born 17 April 1974 in Zakarpattia Oblast, Ukrainian SSR) is a retired Ukrainian professional football player.

Career
Hey spent all his playing career in his native Zakarpattia Oblast clubs, including FC Zakarpattia Uzhhorod in the Ukrainian Premier League.

Personal life
After the football career he is involved in the local politic as a member of the Party of Regions. 

He is the father of Ukrainian footballer Viktor Hey Jr.

References

External links

1974 births
Living people
Ukrainian footballers
FC Karpaty Mukacheve players
FC Hoverla Uzhhorod players
Ukrainian First League players
Ukrainian Second League players
Sportspeople from Zakarpattia Oblast

Association football midfielders